Mrika Nikçi (born December 6, 2001) is an Albanian mountaineer from the Republic of Kosovo.

She is the first Albanian and the youngest female in the world to climb all the Seven Summits. On 15 August 2019, as a seventeen years old, she became the youngest female in the world to climb all the Seven Summits, together with her father Arianit Nikçi(Albanian mountaineer). They became the first Albanians to summit all the Seven Summits. They reached all the Seven Summits for 17 months, six hardest peaks (Vinson, Aconcagua, Everest, Denali, Elbrus and Carstensz Pyremid) summit-ed for 240 days (eight months). They reached this goal following their project Mrika Seven Summits.
After their success, they have appeared in almost all Albanian media and have been an attraction with their interviews
She has also appeared at International media expressing her experiences

Early life 

She was born in Peja, Republic of Kosovo where she lives now. Since she was 7 she started training karate, and was a very successful competitor, champion of Kosovo in Kata and Kumite, also she has black belt grade, Dan1. 
Mrika was a very successful ski competitor too, now she skis for fun with her friends, family and her clients.

Mountain climbing career 
Mrika with the support of her father, who accompanies her in all mountaineering activities, has begun with mountaineering when she was 13 years
old. Mrika has climbed national and regional summits such as:

 Gjeravica (2,656), winter climb (highest peak of Kosovo)
 Jezerca (2.694), winter climb, highest peak in the Dinaric Alps in Albania
 Korab (2.794) (Macedonia–Albania border), the highest peak in Albania, winter climb
 Hajla (2,403) winter climbing (Kosovo)
 Maja e Titos (2.747)-winter climb (Macedonia)
 Maja e Zezë (2,528)–winter climbing (Kosovo)

During 2017 Mrika has continued with her mountaineering activities by climbing 2 summits in Bulgaria, specifically the summit of the Seven Lakes in Rila with an altitude (alt) of 2,648 meters, and the summit of Musala 2,925 alt, the highest peak in Balkan. Also, during 2017 Mrika has attempted the climbing of other European summits. Due to the weather conditions that have undermined the safety of the mountaineers participating in the expedition, these summit attempts will need to repeat:

 Mount Blanc– alt4,880 m – attempt and climb up to the alt of 3,700 m (France).
 Grand Paradiso– alt4,061m – attempt and climb up to the alt of 3.650 m (Italy).

In 2018 Mrika has continued with mountaineering and achieved additional success by climbing to another 2 summits, specifically Grossglockner - 3,798 alt (Austria), and one of the Seven World Summits, the summit of Kilimanjaro - 5,895 alt (Tanzania - Africa).

Seven Summits Challenge 
Based on the success achieved so far and her will to reach a world class level, Mrika and her father have begun preparations for the accomplishment of the Seven World Summits Challenge, and climbed all the seven summits by the following itinerary:

 Kilimanjaro-Africa (5.895 alt), climbed January 29th 2018
 Vinson-Antarctica (4,892), climbed on December 16, 2018
 Aconcagua-South America (6,962), climbed 16 February 2019
 Mount Everest-Asia (8,850), climbed 27 May 2019
 Denali–North America (6,194) climbed on  20 June 2019
 Mount Elbrus– Russia (5,642), climbed on 20 July 2019
 Carstensz Pyramid–Indonesia (4,884), climbed on 15 August, 2019

During her challenge she has experienced difficulties that each mountaineer dream off. During the Mount Everest Summit she has avoided the risks by cleverly choosing the time where to climb. In here interview with CNN she said :

"You know what, when you decide to come and climb Everest, you prepare yourself that you are going to see dead bodies," Mrika adds. "Maybe something can happen to you, your father, or whoever you're climbing with, so you prepare. You see a dead body and it's like, it's ok. He's gone. I don't want to be like him; I have to move on."

"We saw dead bodies along the way. I think that maybe this could reflect negatively on her -- she's only 17 -- but no, she passed that," Arianit (her father) says.

Mountains climbed

Gallery 
 200px  200px  200px

References 

2001 births
21st-century Albanian sportspeople
21st-century Albanian women
Kosovo Albanians
Sportspeople from Peja
Living people
Summiters of Mount Everest
Albanian mountain climbers
Female climbers